Alexander Satschko (born 12 November 1980) is a German retired tennis player. He was a doubles specialist, who achieved his highest doubles ranking of world No. 80 in October 2014. He won his first ATP World Tour title with partner Gero Kretschmer as alternates in Quito on 7 February 2015.

ATP career finals

Doubles: 1 (1 title)

ATP Challenger Tour finals

Doubles: 28 (12 titles, 16 runner-ups)

Doubles performance timeline

Current till 2017 ATP World Tour

References

External links
 
 

1980 births
Living people
German male tennis players
German people of Ukrainian descent
Tennis people from Bavaria
21st-century German people